Dorothea Neumann, (January 26, 1914 – May 20, 1994) sometimes referred to as Dorothy Neumann or Dorothy Newman was an American character actress. Her career spanned six decades and encompassed television, film, and theatre work.

Biography
A native of New York, Neumann began her career in theatre. She was one of the proprietors/performers at the Turnabout Theatre in the 1940s and 1950s. She began appearing on screens in the mid-1940s, featuring in over 130 film and television projects, usually in small supporting roles. In 1962, Neumann appeared as Martha on the TV Western The Virginian in the episode titled "Big Day, Great Day". She was especially known for playing characters in the horror and fantasy genres, such as witches, crones, and gypsies. Her notable projects included the films Sorry, Wrong Number, The Terror, Ghost of Dragstrip Hollow, and The Snake Pit. On the small screen, she featured in televisionshows such as the Twilight Zone ("Mr Bevis"), Leave It to Beaver ("Community Chest"), The Addams Family ("Morticia Joins the Ladies League"), The Man from U.N.C.L.E. ("The Iowa Scuba Affair"), Gunsmoke, The Andy Griffith Show ("Ellie for Council", "A Plaque for Mayberry", and "Deputy Otis", all as Rita Campbell), Bewitched ("The Crone of Cawdor"). and Hank. Neumann was also a cast member of the Yale Puppeteers, at Turnabout Theater, Los Angeles, California, in the 1940s.

Personal life and death
Neumann never married. Neumann was Jewish. She died of pulmonary complications. and was survived by two nieces, two nephews, and seven great nieces and nephews. Following her death, her cremains were given to a niece in Encinitas, California.

References

1914 births
1994 deaths
Actresses from New York City
Deaths from pulmonary embolism
American puppeteers
20th-century American actresses
American stage actresses
Jewish American actresses